Gallovidian can refer to:
 A person from Galloway
 The Gallovidian, a former Galloway magazine 
 The Galwegian Gaelic language